Stephen Paul "Steve" Crabb (born 30 November 1963) is a former middle-distance runner from England. He ran competitively in the 1980s and 1990s for the London athletic club Enfield Harriers. He ran the 1500 metres at the 1988 Olympic Games in Seoul and the 1992 Olympic Games in Barcelona.

Major Competitions 

Crabb was selected to run in the 1987 World Championships 1500 metres with Steve Cram and Adrian Passey.

The following year Crabb qualified to run in the 1988 Olympic 1500 metres with Peter Elliott and Steve Cram ahead of then Olympic champion Sebastian Coe.

Crabb returned to the Olympic games to run in the 1992 Olympic 1500 metres. Also representing Great Britain were Kevin McKay and Matthew Yates.

International competitions

Personal Bests

References

1963 births
Living people
English male middle-distance runners
Olympic athletes of Great Britain
Athletes (track and field) at the 1988 Summer Olympics
Athletes (track and field) at the 1992 Summer Olympics
World Athletics Championships athletes for Great Britain